James Madidilane (born 22 August 1986 in South Africa) is a South African former soccer player who later became a manager.

Career
After leaving Bloemfontein Celtic, Madidilane claimed his career started to decline.

In 2016, Madidilane was appointed manager of Bantu in Lesotho, his first appointment as head coach of a senior team. In his three seasons there, he led the club to two league titles before becoming assistant coach of the Lesotho national team.

References

External links
 

Living people
South African soccer players
1986 births
Association football defenders
Association football midfielders
South Africa international soccer players
Manning Rangers F.C. players
Bloemfontein Celtic F.C. players
Thanda Royal Zulu F.C. players
Maritzburg United F.C. players
Mpumalanga Black Aces F.C. players
South African Premier Division players
South African soccer managers
South African expatriate sportspeople in Lesotho
Expatriate football managers in Lesotho